Konjo may refer to:

 Konjo people of Uganda
 Konjo language (Bantu), the Bantu language spoken by them
 Coastal Konjo language, an Austronesian language spoken in Sulawesi, Indonesia
 Highland Konjo language, an Austronesian language spoken in Sulawesi, Indonesia

See also 
 Kómnzo language, a Papuan language of Papua New Guinea